Dean L. Sicking (born October 15, 1957) is an American inventor and safety researcher.

Early life and education
Born in Muenster, Texas, Sicking received his Bachelors of Science in Mechanical Engineering and Masters of Science and Doctorate of Philosophy in Civil Engineering from Texas A&M.

Career

Beginning at Texas A&M, transitioning to the University of Nebraska-Lincoln, and now at the University of Alabama at Birmingham, Sicking has devoted his professional career to the application of energy management principles to reduce the risk of serious injury and death on the nation's highways, race tracks, and more recently on football fields and ice rinks.

Inventions
Sicking holds 30 patents, the five most significant of which are: the first energy absorbing guardrail terminal, the first crash cushion without sacrificial energy absorbents, the first guardrail capable of containing large SUV's, a trailer mounted impact attenuator, and NASCAR's Steel and Foam Energy Reduction (SAFER) barrier. These technologies have revolutionized their respective markets. They have been adopted around the globe and produced major reductions in the number of serious injuries and fatalities along highways and race tracks.

Sicking's innovations have produced more than $1.3 billion in sales and have prevented thousands of serious injuries and fatalities.

Furthermore, Sicking has been principal or co-principal investigator on research projects with total extramural funding in excess of $30 million. He has authored or co-authored more than 200 technical reports, more than 70 refereed journal papers and 7 books. Additionally, Sicking has developed functional performance standards for a number of different impact attenuation systems, including developing nationally accepted performance standards for roadside safety features. Sicking is in the final stages of development for safer hockey boards and a football helmet that can decouple rotation of the helmet from rotation of the head.

Energy absorbing guardrail terminals
Sicking has devoted his career to designing impact energy management systems, specifically focusing on crashworthy safety systems. Sicking has developed numerous "next generation" designs that have significantly reduced the risk of injury and fatality to motorists, from highway drivers to NASCAR racers. His first global success was the ET-2000, the first energy absorbing guardrail terminal – a device that sits over the end of a guardrail, flattening the guardrail when it is hit by a vehicle. The first study of the device showed that out of 400 crashes, there were three injuries and no fatalities — reducing the risk by a factor of 10. But even with detailed research data and real-world results showing the product a success, Sicking says he gets the most satisfaction from a personal testimonial.

"The first time this thing ever got hit was when a young lady was driving home from the library at the University of Texas," Sicking explains. "She was driving a small pickup truck with her cruise control set at highway speeds when she fell asleep and drifted off the road. She hit the guardrail at 65 or 70 miles per hour, and her only injury was a bruise across her chest caused by the seat belt. I got a very nice letter from her father describing the crash. He felt that she almost certainly would have been killed if she had hit one of the other common guardrail systems, and there is a high probability that he was right. But to hear that from a father whose daughter walked away unhurt—you live for moments like that."

The first implementation of the ET-2000 in the United States caused market prices to soar. To alleviate this issue, Sicking created a second energy absorbing systems that offered meaningful competition in order to reduce costs without sacrificing the safety performance. These two guardrail terminals are now the most widely used in the United States, Canada and Australia.

Building on his first guardrail designs, Sicking developed the first guardrail system capable of safely accommodating light trucks and SUV's. As the center of gravity and bumper heights of SUV's and light trucks increased, pre-1990 guardrails that based their designs on low bumper height vehicles were no longer sufficient. Larger vehicles began to exhibit a tendency to rollover, vault, or rupture guardrails. Sicking led his team to develop a guardrail system that addressed the needs of all vehicle, increasing the rail mounting height, moving rail splices from the posts to the midspan, and increasing blockout depth by four inches. To date, 27 states have adopted this guardrail design, 10 more are currently adopting it, and the remaining 13 have adopted or are evaluating slight variation of this system.

SAFER barrier
Following Dale Earnhardt's fatal wreck in 2001, NASCAR commissioned Sicking to determine the specific cause of Earnhardt's worst injuries. Sicking use video footage to analyze and reconstruct the crash, as well as NASCAR's worst crashes over the 10 years prior. Ultimately, the investigation contributed to the development of Sicking's best-known invention, the SAFER barrier, an energy management system that reduces the impact felt by the driver by flexing and absorbing energy. Prior to the barrier, NASCAR and IndyCar averaged approximately 1.5 driver fatalities yearly. Since the SAFER barrier's implementation in 2004, no fatalities or serious injuries associated with SAFER Barrier's impact have occurred. In fact, the only remotely serious injury sustained has been a broken sternum. The magnitude of the impact of Sicking's technologies is best illustrated by driver comments about the SAFER barrier.

Performance standards
Sicking has assisted in the development of fundamental performance standards that have significantly altered energy management systems in highway safety. This has resulted in an increase in required safety performance of roadside safety systems. He was second author of the Standards for Roadside Safety adopted in 1993 and principle author of the Manual for Assessing Safety Hardware, adopted by the Federal Highway Administration in 2010 and currently used as the standard. These standards have since been implemented in Canada, Australia, Israel, and much of Europe as well. Sicking's quantitative and qualitative crash analyses, similar to those he used for NASCAR, were critical components of these standards.

Sports safety research
In 2011, Sicking turned his attention to impact energy management in sports. Serious neck injuries in hockey are relatively infrequent but can be catastrophic. Impacts with the rigid walls can produce deceleration of over 100 G's, causing severe concussions and even quadriplegia. Sicking led the creation of energy absorbing walls that have been shown to successfully reduce head deceleration by 50% under severe impact conditions. These walls are designed to flex and extend during impacts, reducing peak G's on the player's head by absorbing the energy of the impact. Sicking is now applying this same concept to develop both improved helmet impact performance standards and a helmet that is more flexible and can decouple head rotation from helmet rotation, thus reducing peak G's on the head.

Awards and positions
In recognition of his effects on roadside and motor sports safety, Sicking was elected a Charter Fellow of the National Academy of Inventors, and President George W. Bush awarded him the 2005 National Medal of Technology and Innovation (NMTI). The NMTI is the highest honor that the United States can bestow on a citizen whose technologies have made a positive contribution to the welfare of the nation. Sicking's efforts have also won him the first-awarded Pioneering and Innovation Award in the history of Auto sport magazine, in 2004, for his work on the SAFER barrier. He has also received the 2011 Ken Stonex Award, presented by the Transportation Research Board Committee on Roadside Safety Design, in recognition of a lifetime of achievement in crashworthiness design. The Texas Motorsports Hall of Fame awarded Sicking the 2005 Vision Award for his contributions to racing safety, and countless individual raceways have honored him with their awards, including NASCAR's 2003 Bill France Junior Award for Excellence, Pocono Raceway's 2004 Bill France Award of Excellence, Indianapolis Motor Speedway's Herb Porter Award in 2004, and the 2002 Motorsports Engineering Award from the Society of Automotive Engineers and the Specialty Equipment Market Association, among numerous others.

Sicking is currently Associate Vice President for Commercialization and Product Development at the University of Alabama at Birmingham, as well as President of his own company, Sicking Safety Systems. He formerly served as Director of the Midwest Roadside Safety Facility, during which time he developed the SAFER barrier.  Additionally, Sicking has served on a number of boards and committees, including his former position as Chair of the Roadside Safety Design Committee of the Transportation Research Board from 2003 to 2006 and his current positions on the Scientific Advisory Committee of the National Operating Committee on Standards for Athletic Equipment (NOCSAE) and the Advisory Committee to the National Football League (NFL) Engineering Subcommittee. Sicking also possesses his license as a Professional Engineer (PE) in both Civil and Mechanical Engineering.

References

NASCAR
20th-century American inventors
21st-century American inventors
1957 births
Living people
People from Muenster, Texas